Dukeville may refer to:

Dukeville, Nebraska, an unincorporated community in Knox County
Dukeville, North Carolina, a populated place in Rowan County